The Pekan District is a district in Pahang, Malaysia. Located in the east of Pahang, the district borders Kuantan District on the north, South China Sea on the east, Maran District on the west and Rompin District on the south.

Demographics

The following is based on Department of Statistics Malaysia 2010 census.

Federal Parliament and State Assembly Seats

Pekan district representative in the Federal Parliament (Dewan Rakyat) 

List of Pekan district representatives in the State Legislative Assembly (Dewan Undangan Negeri)

Administrative divisions

Pekan has 11 mukims, which are:
 Pekan (Capital)
 Bebar
 Temai
 Lepar 
 Kuala Pahang
 Langgar 
 Ganchong 
 Pahang Tua
 Pulau Manis
 Pulau Rusa
 Penyor

See also
 Districts of Malaysia

References

External links 

Official website of Pekan District Council